Robert Del Tredici is a Canadian photographer, artist and teacher, who documented the impact of the 1979 Three Mile Island accident on the community. His first book of photographs and interviews, The People of Three Mile Island (Sierra Club Books, 1980), was a social critique of nuclear power. His second book, At Work in the Fields of the Bomb (Harper & Row, 1987), discussed the US nuclear weapons industry and won the 1987 Olive Branch Book Award for its contribution to world peace.

He founded the Atomic Photographers Guild in 1987 along with photographers Carole Gallagher and Harris Fogel. 
 
Del Tredici has a bachelor's degree in philosophy, and a master's in comparative literature.  He currently teaches photography and the history of animated film in Concordia University in Montreal and previously taught at Vanier College.

See also
Anti-nuclear movement in Canada
Kenji Higuchi
Three Mile Island: A Nuclear Crisis in Historical Perspective
Three Mile Island: Thirty Minutes to Meltdown
Three Mile Island accident health effects
James Acord

References

Living people
Canadian photojournalists
Canadian anti–nuclear power activists
Year of birth missing (living people)